Emily Snyder may refer to:

 Emily Stewart, formerly Snyder, a character on the soap opera As the World Turns
 Emily C. A. Snyder (born 1977), American novelist, playwright and director